The Russell Fork is a  tributary of the Levisa Fork in southwestern Virginia and southeastern Kentucky in the United States.  Known for its whitewater, it rises in the Appalachian Mountains of southwest Virginia, in southern Buchanan County at the base of Big A Mountain, and flows northwest into Dickenson County.  The Russell Fork continues to flow through the town of Haysi, Virginia, the Breaks Interstate Park, and the town of Elkhorn City, Kentucky, in Pike County, where it flows into the Levisa Fork which, together with the Tug Fork, form the Big Sandy River.

See also
List of rivers of Kentucky
List of rivers of Virginia
Breaks Interstate Park

References

USGS Hydrologic Unit Map - State of Virginia (1974)

External links
Russell Fork Info

Rivers of Virginia
Landforms of Dickenson County, Virginia
Rivers of Kentucky
Rivers of Pike County, Kentucky